The Sur is a river in India. It is a key tributary of the Wainganga. The river flows south in a winding course through the Vidarbha region of Maharashtra.

Course
The start stream of Sur originate at forest Hills near Maharapeth (R) in Ramtek Taluka of Nagpur district.
The Sur river flows through Ramtek and Mauda Taluka of Nagpur district and Mohadi and Bhandara Taluka of Bhandara district respectively.
This river irrigates lands where rice is cultivation as main crop which is part of Bhandara cluster.

Dams
Ramtek Dam: It is an earthfill dam on Sur, Maharashtra (river) near Ramtek, Nagpur district in the state of Maharashtra in India. The height of the dam above lowest foundation is 22.2 m (73 ft) while the length is 229 m (751 ft). The volume content is 1,300 km3 (310 cu mi) and gross storage capacity is 105,130.00 km3 (25,222.03 cu mi).

Notes and references
Notes

Citations

Rivers of India